Fiebre Tropical is a bilingual young adult novel by Juliàn Delgado Lopera, published March 3, 2020 by Feminist Press.

Reception

Reviews 
Fiebre Tropical was well-received by critics, including starred reviews from Publishers Weekly and Kirkus Reviews, who also named it one of the best books of the year. 

Kirkus Reviews called Fiebre Tropical a "rich, deeply felt novel about family ties, immigration, sexual longing, faith, and desire," saying it was "[s]imultaneously raw and luminous." 

Publishers Weekly called Lopera's writing "funny, fresh, and indelible." The Los Angeles Review of Books referred to the main character's voice as "captivating" and "riotously funny."

Lambda Literary said the book is "[f]unny, irreverent, and deeply moving with its pitch-perfect rendering of the kaleidoscopic emotionality of the character." They also highlighted the book's bilingual prose, saying it is "a much-needed approach to writing about not only immigration but life itself in America. This country is a multi-lingual one, and it is past due that our literature reflects this."The New York Times Book Review also commented on the book's use of both English and Spanish "to bold and farcical effect." Because of the bilingualism, Shelf Awareness noted that "monolinguists may want to have a translation app handy for full comprehension. But context more often than not brings absolute clarity."  Booklist called the code-switching "engaging and lyrical."

Awards

References 

LGBT young adult literature
2020s LGBT novels
Novels with lesbian themes
The Feminist Press Books
Lambda Literary Award-winning works
2020 children's books